Dandaeogeori Station is a railway station on Seoul Subway Line 8. Despite its name, this station is far away from Dankook University.

Station layout

Seoul Metropolitan Subway stations
Metro stations in Seongnam
Railway stations opened in 1996